Lješanska nahija is a historical region in eastern Montenegro. It was a nahija (sub-district) of the Ottoman Empire. In the administration of the Principality of Montenegro, the nahija was part of Old Montenegro, alongside Katun, Rijeka and Crmnica. The Serbian Gradac Monastery was once located within the region.

Lješanska nahija included the area to the Riječka nahija, and was the most impoverished and smallest part of the Principality of Montenegro, consisting of several brotherhoods, which due to some differences among them (especially religious) could not in its entirety establish itself as other tribes.
It was also home to the Albanian tribe of the Goljemadi.

The region was bordered by Lješkopolje, an Ottoman frontier which was not part of Montenegro prior to the Congress of Berlin (1878).

Settlements

Gradac
Šteke
Štitari
Draževina
Kornet
Liješnje
Orasi
Relezi
Podstrana

History
The toponym derives from a Slavicized variant of the Albanian masculine name Lesh  (Lješ).  According to a local tradition, the ancestor arrived from the city of Lezhë, however the actual name is regarded as being much older since 
as early as 1496 Đurađ Crnojević mentions the nobleman Radovan Lъšević (Lješević) in the area of Lješanska nahija, while its inhabitants as Lьšane (Lješane).

The name (Lješanska nahija) is first mentioned in 1692. Traditionally, Vojvodas (The Dukes) came from the House of Uskoković.

Notable people
Mardarije Kornečanin, Metropolitan of Cetinje (1637–59)
Pavle Đurišić, leader of Montenegrin Chetniks in WW2
Dejan Stojanović, Serbian poet, writer and essayist 
Stevan Raičković, Serbian poet, writer and academic 
Gojko Čelebić, Montenegrin writer and diplomat
Vojislav Vukčević, Serbian politician and former minister of diaspora
Sergej Ćetković, Montenegrin singer
Simon Vukčević, Montenegrin footballer 
Marina Vukčević, Montenegrin handball player
Dušan Vukčević, retired Serbian basketball player
Dragiša Burzan, Montenegrin politician and diplomat
Igor Burzanović, Montenegrin footballer
Dragoljub Brnović, former Montenegrin footballer
Branko Brnović, former Montenegrin footballer and current coach
Bojan Brnović, Montenegrin footballer
Nenad Brnović, Montenegrin footballer, brother of the above-mentioned Bojan
Veljko Uskoković, retired Montenegrin water polo player
Grujica Radunović, Montenegrin professor, PhD, Physical Education (1935-2019)
Saša Radunović, retired Montenegrin basketball player

See also
Lješ (disambiguation)

References

Historical regions in Montenegro
Principality of Montenegro

sr:Љешанска нахија